Carew may refer to:

 Carew (surname)
 Carew, Pembrokeshire, in Wales
Carew (electoral ward), a ward coterminous with the Welsh community
 Carew, New Zealand, in the Ashburton District
 Carew, South Australia, see Tatiara District Council#Geography
 Carew, West Virginia, in the United States

See also 
 Carew Park F.C., in Limerick, Ireland
 Carew Tower, a tower in Ohio, United States
 Seaton Carew, a village in Hartlepool, County Durham, England
 Carew Parts LLC, a used auto parts company in United States